Boomerang is a model of roller coaster manufactured and designed by Vekoma, a Dutch manufacturer. The roller coaster model name is from the hunting implement based on the traditions of the Indigenous Australians.  there are 55 Boomerangs operating.

The roller coaster model was created in the early 1980s and was first introduced at four different parks around the world in 1984.

Design and ride experience

The Boomerang consists of a single train with seven cars, capable of carrying 28 passengers. The ride begins when the train is pulled backwards from the station and up the first lift hill by a catchcar. After being released, the train passes through the station, enters a Cobra roll element (referred to as a boomerang by the designers) and then travels through a vertical loop. After being pulled up a second lift hill, the train is released to head backwards through each inversion once more, making the total number of inversions per ride six. The train slows down as it passes through the station backwards and then comes to a complete stop in the station. This coaster model is popular among many amusement parks in the United States, but it has appeared at amusement parks around the world.

Boomerang coasters have occasionally stalled, often in the Cobra Roll element. As a precaution, many Boomerang coasters are built with an access platform just under the Cobra Roll/Boomerang element.

In back row of the trainthe first to enter the loopthis represents one of the most forceful moments seen in steel rollercoaster design.

Variant designs
There are three main design variants based on the Boomerang layout, all of which are produced by Vekoma.

Invertigo

The first variant of the Boomerang is the Invertigo. While retaining the same layout as the Boomerang, the Invertigo has inverted track, turning it into an inverted roller coaster. Each car has two rows of seats that are back-to-back, so the riders in the back row of each car would be facing those in the front of the trailing car. The first Invertigo, HangOver at Liseberg in Gothenburg, Sweden was supposed to open in 1996 with a new linear induction motor (LIM) or LSM lift. However, development problems delayed the ride's opening to 1997, and the design was remade to include a traditional chain lift like the original Boomerang. Only four Invertigo models were ever built.

Giant Inverted Boomerang

The second design is known as both the Giant Inverted Boomerang and the Super Invertigo. While maintaining a similar layout to the Boomerang, the track is again inverted and the size of the ride is increased. The track is  longer, the two lift hills are almost  taller and both hills are vertical. As of 2022, four Giant Inverted Boomerangs operate and one was under construction.

Family Boomerang
In late 2010, Vekoma announced that they would be manufacturing a family-friendly model of the Boomerang. The prototype opened at Drayton Manor Theme Park, as "Ben 10Ultimate Mission", in April 2011; it was later renamed to Accelerator. Another model debuted on 17 May 2016 as “Velociraptor”, in the ‘Lost Kingdom’ themed area of Paultons Park. Unlike the other Boomerang roller coasters, a Family Boomerang does not feature inversions, but it still retains a similar shuttle design. The ride features the two signature end-spikes on (more or less) a figure-8 track layout. Phantasialand added the world's largest family boomerang, “Raik”, in 2016. This debuted in the new themed area of ‘Klugheim’, accompanying the adjacent Taron (an Intamin Blitz coaster).

Layouts

Ride locations

See also
 Invertigo (roller coaster)
 Giant Inverted Boomerang

References

External links

 Listing of Boomerang roller coasters at RCDB
 Listing of Invertigo roller coasters at RCDB
 Listing of Giant Inverted Boomerang roller coasters at RCDB
 Detailed Technical Article about Boomerang Roller Coasters
 Boomerang official website
 Family Boomerang official website

 
Knott's Berry Farm
Former roller coasters in California
Steel roller coasters
Mass-produced roller coasters
Roller coasters manufactured by Vekoma
Roller coasters operated by Cedar Fair
Roller coasters introduced in 1984
Vekoma
Roller coasters in the Netherlands